Mike Dailly may refer to:
 Mike Dailly (lawyer)
 Mike Dailly (game designer)

See also
Mike Dailey, American football coach
Mike Daly, American record producer and musician
Michael Daly (disambiguation)
Michael Daley (disambiguation)